The Cathedral is a 2002 animated science fiction short film directed by Tomasz Bagiński. It is based on the short story of the same name by Jacek Dukaj, winner of the Janusz A. Zajdel Award in 2000. The film was nominated in 2002 for the Academy Award for Best Animated Short Film for the 75th Academy Awards. The film also won the title of Best Animated Short at SIGGRAPH 2002 in San Antonio.

Plot
The film focuses on a man who visits a mystical, organic building that looks like a medieval cathedral. As he walks through the immense structure, the light from his torch falls upon the pillars, revealing human faces. The viewer later realizes that the faces are still alive, as several smile and open their eyes as the man walks past them.  The building's nature is partially unveiled at sunrise as the blinding light enchants the visitor and causes organic branch-like structures to burst from his chest. These protrusions then become another set of pillars in the building.

Reception
The film was nominated in 2002 for the Academy Award for Best Animated Short Film for the 75th Academy Awards. The movie won the title of Best Animated Short at SIGGRAPH 2002 in San Antonio as well as several other awards.

In May 2011, Polish Prime Minister Donald Tusk gave several gifts to American President Barack Obama for his tour in Europe, as is the custom. One of those gifts was an iPad loaded with The Cathedral.

See also

Fallen Art

References

External links
 The Cathedral by Platige Image
 

2000 short stories
Science fiction short stories
Films based on short fiction
2002 science fiction films
Polish animated science fiction films
Polish short stories
Polish silent short films
Cathedrals in fiction
Religion in science fiction
Films about death
Novels about death
Science fiction short films
Polish animated short films
2002 short films
2002 films
Jacek Dukaj